Morgiana is a 1972 Czechoslovak Gothic drama film directed by Juraj Herz, based on a novel by Alexander Grin, Jessie and Morgiana (1929, Wikisource: Джесси и Моргиана). The story is about two sisters, Klara and Viktoria, and the jealousy that overcomes Viktoria when her sister inherits most of their father's property. When Klara becomes involved with a man that her sister loves, Viktoria begins to plot her murder.

The roles of both sisters are played by the actress Iva Janžurová.

Beach scenes were shot in Bulgaria.

Cast 
 Iva Janžurová as Klára / Viktoria
 Josef Abrhám as Marek
 Nina Divíšková as Otylie
 Petr Čepek as Glenar
 Josef Somr as Drunkard
 Jiří Kodet as Bessant

References

External links

1972 films
Czechoslovak drama films
1970s Czech-language films
Czech drama films
Czech horror films
Films set in Bulgaria
1970s Czech films